Snyatinovo is a rural locality (a village) in Karinskoye Rural Settlement, Alexandrovsky District, Vladimir Oblast, Russia. The population was 15 as of 2010. There are 10 streets.

Geography 
Snyatinovo is located on the Molokcha River, 32 km southwest of Alexandrov (the district's administrative centre) by road. Gideyevo is the nearest rural locality.

References 

Rural localities in Alexandrovsky District, Vladimir Oblast